The Creeper is a 1948 American horror film directed by Jean Yarbrough. The film stars Onslow Stevens who plays a mad doctor whose serum turns a man into a catlike killer.

Plot
 Two scientists on an expedition to the West Indies discover a serum which changes humans into cats, or. at least, to catlike killers. One believes they should continue with their experiments and the other does not, which disagreement costs him his life. Several deaths occur before the first scientist is halted in his mad plans.

Cast

Production
Between 1947 and 1951, Hollywood studios made almost no horror films with The Creeper being the lone exception. It was developed under the working title The Cat Man and was in production from the beginning of March 1948 to the middle of the month.

Release
The Creeper was distributed theatrically by Twentieth Century-Fox Film Corp. in September 1948. According to a March 1949 Hollywood Reporter article, radio writer Joseph Ruscoll sued Edward Small for using the title of Ruscoll's radio show, The Creeper for the film.  The suit was settled for an undisclosed sum.

Reception
In a contemporary review, Dorothy Masters of New York Daily News described The Creeper as an effort "wasted in every phase, including story, performance and general production ... To further the bafflement, perfectly innocent people are given sinister mien. Three murders and a couple of near-misses don't improve the tale."

References

Sources

External links
The Creeper at IMDb
The Creeper at Film Fanatic

1948 films
1948 horror films
American science fiction horror films
20th Century Fox films
American independent films
Mad scientist films
American black-and-white films
Films directed by Jean Yarbrough
1940s American films